Skull and Bones, also known as The Order, Order 322 or The Brotherhood of Death, is an undergraduate senior secret student society at Yale University in New Haven, Connecticut. The oldest senior class society at the university, Skull and Bones has become a cultural institution known for its powerful alumni and various conspiracy theories. It is one of the "Big Three" societies at Yale, the other two being Scroll and Key and Wolf's Head.

The society's alumni organization, the Russell Trust Association, owns the organization's real estate and oversees the membership. The society is known informally as "Bones," and members are known as "Bonesmen," "Members of The Order" or "Initiated to The Order."

History 
Skull and Bones was founded in 1832 after a dispute among Yale debating societies Linonia, Brothers in Unity, and the Calliopean Society over that season's Phi Beta Kappa awards. William Huntington Russell and Alphonso Taft co-founded "the Order of the Skull and Bones". The first senior members included Russell, Taft, and 12 other members. Alternative names for Skull and Bones are The Order, Order 322 and The Brotherhood of Death.

The society's assets are managed by its alumni organization, the Russell Trust Association, incorporated in 1856 and named after the Bones' co-founder. The association was founded by Russell and Daniel Coit Gilman, a Skull and Bones member.

The first extended description of Skull and Bones, published in 1871 by Lyman Bagg in his book Four Years at Yale, noted that "the mystery now attending its existence forms the one great enigma which college gossip never tires of discussing." Brooks Mather Kelley attributed the interest in Yale senior societies to the fact that underclassmen members of then freshman, sophomore, and junior class societies returned to campus the following years and could share information about society rituals, while graduating seniors were, with their knowledge of such, at least a step removed from campus life.

Skull and Bones selects new members among students every spring as part of Yale University's "Tap Day", and has done so since 1879. Since the society's inclusion of women in the early 1990s, Skull and Bones selects fifteen men and women of the junior class to join the society. Skull and Bones "taps" those that it views as campus leaders and other notable figures for its membership.

The number "322" appears in Skull and Bones' insignia and is widely reported to be significant as the year of Greek orator Demosthenes' death. A letter between early society members in Yale's archives suggests that 322 is a reference to the year 322 BCE and that members measure dates from this year instead of from the common era. In 322 BC, the Lamian War ended with the death of Demosthenes and Athenians were made to dissolve their government and establish a plutocratic system in its stead, whereby only those possessing 2,000 drachmas or more could remain citizens. Documents in the Tomb have purportedly been found dated to "Anno-Demostheni." Members measure time of day according to a clock 5 minutes out of sync with normal time, the latter is called "barbarian time."

One legend is that the numbers in the society's emblem ("322") represent "founded in '32, 2nd corps", referring to a first Corps in an unknown German university.

Facilities

Tomb
The Skull and Bones Hall is otherwise known as the "Tomb".

The building was built in three phases: the first wing was built in 1856, the second wing in 1903, and Davis-designed Neo-Gothic towers were added to the rear garden in 1912. The front and side facades are of Portland brownstone in an Egypto-Doric style. The 1912 tower additions created a small enclosed courtyard in the rear of the building, designed by Evarts Tracy and Edgerton Swartwout of Tracy and Swartwout, New York. Evarts Tracy was an 1890 Bonesman, and his paternal grandmother, Martha Sherman Evarts, and maternal grandmother, Mary Evarts, were the sisters of William Maxwell Evarts, an 1837 Bonesman.

The architect was possibly Alexander Jackson Davis or Henry Austin. Architectural historian Patrick Pinnell includes an in-depth discussion of the dispute over the identity of the original architect in his 1999 Yale campus history. Pinnell speculates that the re-use of the Davis towers in 1911 suggests Davis's role in the original building and, conversely, Austin was responsible for the architecturally similar brownstone Egyptian Revival Grove Street Cemetery gates, built in 1845. Pinnell also discusses the Tomb's esthetic place in relation to its neighbors, including the Yale University Art Gallery. In the late 1990s, New Hampshire landscape architects Saucier and Flynn designed the wrought iron fence that surrounds a portion of the complex.

Deer Island
The society owns and manages Deer Island, an island retreat on the St. Lawrence River. Alexandra Robbins, author of a book on Yale secret societies, wrote:

Bonesmen

Skull and Bones's membership developed a reputation in association with the "power elite". Regarding the qualifications for membership, Lanny Davis wrote in the 1968 Yale yearbook:

Like other Yale senior societies, Skull and Bones membership was almost exclusively limited to white Protestant males for much of its history. While Yale itself had exclusionary policies directed at particular ethnic and religious groups, the senior societies were even more exclusionary. While some Catholics were able to join such groups, Jews were more often not. Some of these excluded groups eventually entered Skull and Bones by means of sports, through the society's practice of tapping standout athletes. Star football players tapped for Skull and Bones included the first Jewish player (Al Hessberg, class of 1938) and African-American player (Levi Jackson, class of 1950, who turned down the invitation for the Berzelius Society).

Yale became coeducational in 1969, prompting some other secret societies such as St. Anthony Hall to transition to co-ed membership, yet Skull and Bones remained fully male until 1992. The Bones class of 1971's attempt to tap women for membership was opposed by Bones alumni, who dubbed them the "bad club" and quashed their attempt. "The issue", as it came to be called by Bonesmen, was debated for decades. The class of 1991 tapped seven female members for membership in the next year's class, causing conflict with the alumni association. The trust changed the locks on the Tomb and the Bonesmen instead met in the Manuscript Society building. A mail-in vote by members decided 368–320 to permit women in the society, but a group of alumni led by William F. Buckley obtained a temporary restraining order to block the move, arguing that a formal change in bylaws was needed. Other alumni, such as John Kerry and R. Inslee Clark, Jr., spoke out in favor of admitting women. The dispute was highlighted on an editorial page of The New York Times. A second alumni vote, in October 1991, agreed to accept the Class of 1992, and the lawsuit was dropped.

Members are assigned nicknames (e.g., "Long Devil", the tallest member; "Boaz", a varsity football captain; or "Sherrife" prince of future). Many of the chosen names are drawn from literature (e.g., "Hamlet", "Uncle Remus") religion, and myth. The banker Lewis Lapham passed on his nickname, "Sancho Panza", to the political adviser Tex McCrary. Averell Harriman was "Thor", Henry Luce was "Baal", McGeorge Bundy was "Odin", and George H. W. Bush was "Magog".

Judith Ann Schiff, Chief Research Archivist at the Yale University Library, has written: "The names of its members weren't kept secretthat was an innovation of the 1970sbut its meetings and practices were." While resourceful researchers could assemble member data from these original sources, in 1985, Charlotte Thomson Iserbyt provided Antony C. Sutton with rosters and records that had belonged to her father, a member of the organization. This membership information was kept privately for over 15years, as Sutton feared that the photocopied pages could somehow identify the member who leaked it. He wrote a book on the group, America's Secret Establishment: An Introduction to the Order of Skull and Bones. The information was finally reformatted as an appendix in the book Fleshing out Skull and Bones, a compilation edited by Kris Millegan and published in 2003.

Among prominent alumni are former president and Chief Justice William Howard Taft (a founder's son); former presidents and father and son George H. W. Bush and George W. Bush; Chauncey Depew, president of the New York Central Railroad System, and a United States Senator from New York; Juan Terry Trippe, Founder & CEO, Pan American World Airways (Pan Am); Joseph Gibson Hoyt, the first chancellor of Washington University in St. Louis; Supreme Court Justices Morrison R. Waite and Potter Stewart; James Jesus Angleton, "mother of the Central Intelligence Agency"; Henry Stimson, U.S. Secretary of War (1940–1945); Robert A. Lovett, U.S. Secretary of Defense (1951–1953); William B. Washburn, Governor of Massachusetts; and Henry Luce, founder and publisher of Time, Life, Fortune, and Sports Illustrated magazines.

John Kerry, former U.S. Secretary of State and former U.S. Senator; Stephen A. Schwarzman, founder of Blackstone Group; Austan Goolsbee, Chairman of Barack Obama's Council of Economic Advisers; Harold Stanley, co-founder of Morgan Stanley; and Frederick W. Smith, founder of FedEx, are all reported to be members.

In the 2004 U.S. Presidential election, both the Democratic and Republican nominees were alumni. George W. Bush wrote in his autobiography, "[In my] senior year I joined Skull and Bones, a secret society; so secret, I can't say anything more." When asked what it meant that he and Bush were both Bonesmen, former presidential candidate John Kerry said, "Not much, because it's a secret."  Tim Russert on Meet The Press asked both President Bush and John Kerry about their memberships to Skull and Bones, to which the president replied, "It's so secret we can't talk about it." Kerry replied, "You trying to get rid of me here?"

Crooking

Skull and Bones has a reputation for stealing keepsakes from other Yale societies or from campus buildings; society members reportedly call the practice "crooking" and strive to outdo each other's "crooks".

The society has been accused of possessing the stolen skulls of Martin Van Buren, Geronimo, and Pancho Villa.

Conspiracy theories
The group Skull and Bones is featured in books and movies which claim that the society plays a role in a global conspiracy for world control. There have been rumors that Skull and Bones is a branch of the Illuminati, having been founded by German university alumni following the order's suppression in their native land by Karl Theodor, Elector of Bavaria with the support of Frederick the Great of Prussia, or that Skull and Bones itself controls the CIA.

References in fiction

 Skull and Bones has been satirized from time to time in the Doonesbury comic strips by Garry Trudeau, Yale graduate and Scroll and Key member. There are overt references, especially in 1980 and December 1988, with reference to George H. W. Bush, and again when the society first admitted women.
 The Skulls (2000) and The Skulls II (2002) films are based on the conspiracy theories surrounding Skull and Bones. A third film, The Skulls III (2004), is based on the first woman to be "tapped" to join the society.
 In Baz Luhrmann's film version of F. Scott Fitzgerald's novel The Great Gatsby, Nick Carraway calls Tom Buchanan Boaz. Tom in turn calls Nick Shakespeare. Nick has said earlier that he met Tom at Yale. It is thereby implied that they were in Skull and Bones together. In the novel, Yale is not explicitly mentioned (rather, they were at college in New Haven together) and it is only stated that they were in the same senior society.
 In The Good Shepherd (2006) the protagonist becomes a member of Skull and Bones while studying at Yale.
 In The Simpsons season 28 episode "The Caper Chase," Mr. Burns visits the Skull and Bones society to meet with Bourbon Verlander about for-profit universities. In the episode "The Canine Mutiny" (season 8) after doing a secret handshake with a dog, Mr. Burns says: "I believe this dog was in Skull & Bones."
 In Family Guy episode, "No Chris Left Behind," when Chris Griffin is being bullied by the richer students at Morningwood Academy, Lois Griffin asks her father, Carter Pewterschmidt, to help Chris. So Carter invites Chris to join Skull and Bones with the other students, who begin to accept him. As part of his initiation, Carter and Chris adopt an orphan and lock him out of the car, which is filled with toys and a puppy, and then drive away when he's unable to get in. Chris though finds out how hard his family is working to pay for his school. At his initiation ceremony, Carter tells Chris that he must spend "Seven minutes in heaven" with their most senior member, Herbert. Chris though feels uncomfortable about joining and convinces Carter to help him get back into his old school. 
 In American Dad! episode, "Bush Comes to Dinner," when President George W. Bush goes out drinking with Hayley, a drunken Bush dances and sings, "Let's all do the Skull and Bones!" 
 In Season 1, Episode 33 of the 1966 Batman TV series, "Fine Finny Fiends" there is a gathering at Wayne Manor during which one guest points out a portrait of Bruce Wayne’s great-grandfather wearing a Yale sweater. He asks if it is true that Bruce’s ancestor was tapped for Skull and Bones, to which Aunt Harriet replies that he was not tapped for it, but "he FOUNDED Skull and Bones!"

See also
 List of Skull and Bones members
 Collegiate secret societies in North America
 Stewards Society (Georgetown University)
 Seven Society (University of Virginia)

References

Further reading
 Hodapp, Christopher, and Alice Von Kannon (2008). Conspiracy Theories & Secret Societies For Dummies. Hoboken, NJ: Wiley. .
 
 Klimczuk, Stephen, and Gerald Warner (2009). Secret Places, Hidden Sanctuaries: Uncovering Mysterious Sites, Symbols, and Societies. New York and London: Sterling Publishing. . pp. 212–232 ("University Secret Societies and Dueling Corps").
 Robbins, Alexandra (2003). Secrets of the Tomb: Skull and Bones, the Ivy League, and the Hidden Paths of Power. Back Bay Books. .
 Rosenbaum, Ron (Sep. 1977). "The Last Secrets of Skull and Bones." Esquire.
 Sutton, Antony C. (2003). America's Secret Establishment: An Introduction to the Order of Skull & Bones. Walterville, OR: TrineDay, 2003. .
 Sutton, Antony C., et al. (2003). Fleshing Out Skull & Bones Investigations Into America's Most Powerful Secret Society. TrineDay.  (hardcover).  (softcover).

External links

 Yale University archives of Skull and Bones
 A look inside Yale’s secret societies – and why they may no longer matter

 
1832 establishments in the United States
Secret societies in the United States
Secret societies at Yale
Student organizations established in 1832